Fred Murphy (23 August 1924 – 1983) was an Australian wrestler. He competed in the men's Greco-Roman welterweight at the 1956 Summer Olympics.

References

External links
 

1924 births
1983 deaths
Australian male sport wrestlers
Olympic wrestlers of Australia
Wrestlers at the 1956 Summer Olympics